Somatina fraus is a moth of the  family Geometridae. It is found in the Central African Republic.

References

Moths described in 1916
Scopulini